Pakistan–Arab relations refer to foreign relations between Pakistan and the various states of the Arab world which constitute the Arab League.

Comparison

Background
Pakistan has a close and strong relationship  with the Middle-Eastern region, particularly Saudi Arabia, United Arab Emirates, Syria, Jordan, Yemen, Oman, Qatar, Lebanon, Kuwait, and Iraq . These ties were put to the test when a massive earthquake hit Pakistan's Northern Areas in 2005 with Saudi Arabia & UAE promptly dispatching critical aid, not only in terms of medicine & essential supplies but massive injunction of billions of dollars for the reconstruction of the region. Pakistan also enjoys extensive cultural & defense/military ties with most of the Arab League member states. Pakistan also has extensive trade ties with Arab League states, especially Saudi Arabia and the UAE with Saudi Arabia ranking as Pakistan's second largest trading partner after the United States. With such close association to the Arab League, Pakistan was also invited by Russian President, Vladimir Putin in 2006 to the First Session of the Russia-Islamic World Strategic Vision Group in 2006 in a bid to strengthen Moscow's ties with the big players in the Muslim world.

Army, Naval and Air Force cadets from many of the Arab League countries routinely enroll in training courses in Pakistan's well-recognized military academies while Pakistan Air Force pilots have flown Egyptian, Jordanian, Syrian and Saudi fighter jets in both wars (1967 & 1973 against Israel) & peacetime as part of their 'foreign deployments'. Units from the Pakistan Army, Navy and Air Force also serve allotted time periods in their respective fields in Saudi Arabia and UAE as instructors, maintenance crews, etc. while there are strong indications that a company of Elite Pakistani Commandos, the SSG maintains a permanent unit in Saudi Arabia to safeguard Islam's holiest sites as well as the Saudi Royal Family. Much of the United Arab Emirates Air Force and Army is made up of Pakistani military personnel.

In 2007 Pakistani President, Pervez Musharraf attended the Arab League summit held in Riyadh even though Pakistan had not yet gained 'Observer Member' status. Pakistan is currently in the stages of finalizing a Free Trade Agreement with the GCC countries, many of whom are also part of the Arab League while talks continue to grant Pakistan the 'Observer' status in the coming months. The country also has a history of being an ardent supporter of several Arab causes, including Palestine.

See also
 Foreign relations of the Arab League
 Pakistan-OIC relations
 Iran–Pakistan relations
 Pakistan–Turkey relations

References

Pakistan
Arab League
Middle East–Pakistan relations